Men's 3 metre springboard event at the 2019 European Diving Championships was contested on 9 August.

Results
32 athletes participated at the event; the best 12 from the preliminary round qualified for the final.

Preliminary round

Final

References

M